Khakashan (also Romanized as Khākashān) is a village in Basharyat-e Sharqi Rural District, Basharyat District, Abyek County, Qazvin Province, Iran. At the 2006 census, its population was 737, in 198 families.

References 

Populated places in Abyek County